Long Bridge may refer to:

Bridges

Denmark 
Langebro, Copenhagen

United Kingdom 
Barnstaple Long Bridge, Devon
Bideford Long Bridge, Devon
Long Bridge, a former bridge in the location of the present Queen's Bridge, Belfast

United States 
Long Bridge (Potomac River), one of the 14th Street Bridges in Washington, D.C.
Huey P. Long Bridge (Baton Rouge) in Baton Rouge, Louisiana
Huey P. Long Bridge (Jefferson Parish) in Jefferson Parish, Louisiana (near New Orleans)
Sarah Mildred Long Bridge between Portsmouth, New Hampshire and Kittery, Maine

Serbia 
 Long Bridge, Belgrade, the oldest permanent bridge in Belgrade, built in 1688

Towns 
Long Bridge, in Lafayette Parish, Louisiana, United States

See also 
 Long–Allen Bridge (disambiguation), several bridges named for Huey P. Long and Oscar K. Allen
 Longbridge (disambiguation)
 Uzunköprü Bridge, Turkey